General Pinedo is a town in the south of the province of Chaco, Argentina.

References

 

Populated places in Chaco Province
Cities in Argentina
Argentina